The 1885 Brooklyn Grays finished the season in fifth place. The team added several players from the defunct Cleveland Blues team after team owner Charlie Byrne bought the Blues assets for $10,000 after the 1884 season.

Offseason 
 Prior to 1885 season: Ed Swartwood was purchased by the Grays from the Pittsburgh Alleghenys.
 January 3, 1885: Doc Bushong was purchased by the Grays from the Cleveland Blues, and subsequently assigned to the St. Louis Browns.
 January 3, 1885: John Harkins, Pete Hotaling, Bill Krieg, Bill Phillips, George Pinkney and Germany Smith were purchased by the Grays from the Cleveland Blues.
 January 15, 1885: Bill McClellan was purchased by the Grays from the Philadelphia Phillies.

Regular season

Season standings

Record vs. opponents

Roster

Player stats

Batting

Starters by position 
Note: Pos = Position; G = Games played; AB = At bats; R = Runs scored; H = Hits; Avg. = Batting average; HR = Home runs; RBI = Runs batted in

Other batters 
Note: G = Games played; AB = At bats; R = Runs scored; H = Hits; Avg. = Batting average; HR = Home runs; RBI = Runs batted in

Pitching

Starting pitchers 
Note: G = Games pitched; GS = Games started; IP = Innings pitched; W = Wins; L = Losses; ERA = Earned run average; BB = Walks allowed; SO = Strikeouts; CG = Complete games

Notes

References 
Baseball-Reference season page
Baseball Almanac season page

External links 
Acme Dodgers page 
Retrosheet

Brooklyn Grays season
Los Angeles Dodgers seasons
Brooklyn
19th century in Brooklyn
Park Slope